Naan Valartha Thangai is a 1958 Indian Tamil language drama film directed by Ch. Narayanamurthy. The film stars Prem Nazir and Pandari Bai. It was released on 10 November 1958.

Plot

Cast 
List adapted from the database of Film News Anandan

Male cast
Prem Nazir
S. V. Subbaiah
Nagesh
V. R. Rajagopal
T. K. Ramachandran

Female cast
Pandari Bai
Mynavathi
Helen
Suryakala
Daisy Irani (as child artiste)

Production 
The film was produced under the banner Saravanabhava Unity Pictures and directed by Ch. Narayanamurthy. Story was by P. A. Padmanabha Rao while the dialogues were written by Ra. Vi. Cinematography was handled by P. Ramasamy and editing was done by K. Govindasamy. S. V. S. Rama Rao was in charge of art direction. P. S. Gopalakrishnan, Chopra and Venugopal handled the choreography. Still photography was done by R. N. Nagaraja Rao and K. Vinayagam. The film was shot at Neptune studios and processed in AVM laboratory.

Soundtrack 
Music was composed by Pendyala Nageswara Rao while the lyrics were penned by Pattukkottai Kalyanasundaram and Thanjai N. Ramaiah Dass.

Release 
Naan Valartha Thangai was released on 10 November 1958, delayed from a September release.

References

External links 

1950s Tamil-language films
1958 drama films
1958 films
Films scored by Pendyala Nageswara Rao
Indian black-and-white films
Indian drama films